Protos of Nonnendamm was a German car manufacturing company founded in 1898 in Berlin by engineers Alfred Sternberg and Oscar Heymann.

Sternberg initially manufactured a series of small motors, 2.5 hp single-cylinder air-cooled, and others water-cooled of 3.5 hp. In 1905 he began producing Protos automobiles, developing the new 'kompensmotor' or compensated motor, giving a smooth, fast ride. To dampen engine vibrations, Sternberg designed a motor with two cylinders and a third piston set at 180 degrees from the other two and having no other function than to act as a counterbalance to the two working pistons. This revolutionary design worked well and was much quieter than other twin engines in the country, providing up to 14 hp and remaining in production for several years.

Protos' six-cylinder vehicle found many buyers, including Crown Prince Wilhelm II, and his brother Prince Heinrich of Prussia who invented and patented the first windscreen wipers for cars in 1908. Crown Prince Wilhelm II's stable of cars consisted entirely of Protos so that the firm could advertise in 1911 "The German Crown Prince, a sportsman and automobile expert, drives only Protos vehicles."

In 1906 the headquarters were moved from 39 Schöneberg Großgörschenstraße to Berlin-Reinickendorf. The Protos gain worldwide acclaim in 1908 when it was first to cross the finishing line in the 1908 New York to Paris Race organised by the newspapers Le Matin of Paris, and The New York Times - six competitors covered some 13 000 miles, an additional 10 000 miles being over sea. In 1910, having run into financial difficulties, the company was bought by the Siemens-Schuckert-Werken and Ernst Valentin, and moved to Nonnendamm, whence the name Protos Automobilwerk Nonnendamm GmbH. In 1911 the company name was changed to Protos Automobil GmbH.

Protos also developed electric vehicles, some of which were produced by Bergmann Elektrizitätswerken in Berlin-Wilhelmsruh. In 1926 the company was sold to AEG, and Protos merged with NAG (Nationale Automobil Gesellschaft), a subsidiary of AEG). The company NAG-Protos AG was dissolved a year later in 1927, the company in its 22-year existence having produced over 25 000 vehicles.

Around 1908 on the Nonnendamm in Berlin Protos built electric trucks for municipal use. The Protos vehicle was driven by motors located on the rear wheels. In addition to the normal steering wheel were two additional steering wheels located on left and right which could be operated by the driver while walking beside the vehicle.  This utility E-LKW was also supplied by Protos as a normal truck of four-ton payload and as an omnibus. The chassis were built by Siemens-Schuckertwerke and the motors by Siemens & Halske. In 1911 commercial electric vehicles were introduced. In addition to automobiles and vans, truck and coach models were produced from 1913 with 2.5t capacity and up to 30 hp. During the First World War many trucks came with 40 hp and a 3t payload. In addition a model was built with 50 hp and 4.5t payload. After the War trucks were no longer produced and those that had been  stockpiled were still available until the 1920s. Production was limited to passenger cars and vans.

Models from 1905 to 1927
Protos was a car manufacturer with a very high reputation for reliability, due in part to its car participating in the 1908 New York to Paris Race.

External links
Gallery of Protos vehicles
The 1908 Race
Siemens-Halske

References

Electric vehicle manufacturers of Germany
Defunct motor vehicle manufacturers of Germany
Manufacturing companies based in Berlin
Companies of Prussia